Canucha duplexa is a moth of the family Drepanidae first described by Frederic Moore in 1866. It is found in India and Myanmar.

Subspecies
Canucha duplexa duplexa (north-eastern India, Sikkim)
Canucha duplexa birmana Bryk, 1943 (north-eastern Myanmar)

References

Moths described in 1866
Drepaninae